Farcimen is a genus of land snails with an operculum, terrestrial gastropod mollusks in the family Megalomastomatidae.

Species 
Species within the genus Farcimen include:
 Farcimen alutaceum (Menke in Pfeiffer, 1846)
 Farcimen arangoi Torre & Bartsch, 1942
 Farcimen auriculatum (d’Orbigny, 1842)
 Farcimen bartschi Alcalde, 1945
 Farcimen bilabiatum Alcalde, 1945
 Farcimen bituberculatum (Sowerby, 1850)
 Farcimen camagueyanum Torre & Bartsch, 1942
 Farcimen cisnerosi Alcalde, 1945
 Farcimen guanense Torre & Bartsch, 1942
 Farcimen guitarti Torre & Bartsch, 1942
 Farcimen gundlachi (Pfeiffer, 1856)
 Farcimen hendersoni Torre & Bartsch, 1942
 Farcimen imperator Alcalde, 1945
 Farcimen jaumei Alcalde, 1945
 Farcimen leoninum (Pfeiffer, 1856)
 Farcimen magister Torre & Bartsch, 1942
 Farcimen majusculum Alcalde, 1945
 Farcimen mani (Poey, 1851)
 Farcimen najazaense Torre & Bartsch, 1942
 Farcimen obesum Torre & Bartsch, 1942
 Farcimen procer (Poey, 1854)
 Farcimen pseudotortum Torre & Bartsch, 1942
 Farcimen rocai Torre & Bartsch, 1942
 Farcimen seminudum (Poey, 1854)
 Farcimen subventricosum Torre & Bartsch, 1942
 Farcimen superbum Torre & Bartsch, 1942
 Farcimen torrei (Guitart, 1936)
 Farcimen tortum (Wood, 1828)
 Farcimen ungula (Poey, 1856)
 Farcimen ventricosum (d’Orbigny, 1842)
 Farcimen vignalense Torre & Bartsch, 1942
 Farcimen wrighti Torre & Bartsch, 1942
 Farcimen yunquense Torre & Bartsch, 1942

References 

Megalomastomatidae